Demonstealer may refer to:

 Demonstealer (gamebook), a Fighting Fantasy gamebook
 Demonstealer (album), a 2000 album by Demonic Resurrection
 Demonstealer Records, an independent record label based in Mumbai, India